The 1931 Annandale state by-election was held on 18 April 1931 for the New South Wales Legislative Assembly electorate of Annandale because the seat of Robert Stuart-Robertson was declared vacant on 9 April 1931 as he had been declared bankrupt.

Stuart-Robertson re-contested and was returned with a reduced majority. There was some controversy over using Anzac Day for the by-election. He defeated the Independent candidate Harry Meatheringham who had contested four previous elections in the seats of Auburn, North Shore and North Sydney, as well as Communist William Morrison and another Independent Martha Simpson, two first time candidates who never stood again.

Results

The seat was declared vacant on 9 April 1931 because Robert Stuart-Robertson had been declared bankrupt.

See also
Electoral results for the district of Annandale
List of New South Wales state by-elections

Notes

References

1931 elections in Australia
New South Wales state by-elections
1930s in New South Wales